Skol is a 1979 live album by Oscar Peterson, accompanied by Stéphane Grappelli.

Track listing
 "Nuages" (Jacques Larue, Django Reinhardt) – 8:18
 "How About You?" (Timothy D. Martin, Walter Edward Meskell) – 5:19
 "Someone to Watch Over Me" (George Gershwin, Ira Gershwin) – 6:50
 "Makin' Whoopee" (Walter Donaldson, Gus Kahn) – 5:10
 "That's All" (Alan Brandt, Bob Haymes) – 7:33
 "Skol Blues" (Oscar Peterson) – 7:04

Additional Track listing (2013 Remaster)
 "Honeysuckle Rose" (Andy Razaf) – 6:32
 "Solitude" (Duke Ellington) – 5:59
 "I Got Rhythm" (George Gershwin, Ira Gershwin) – 6:33

Personnel

Performance
 Oscar Peterson – piano
 Stéphane Grappelli – violin
 Joe Pass – guitar
 Niels-Henning Ørsted Pedersen – double bass
 Mickey Roker – drums

References

Oscar Peterson live albums
Joe Pass live albums
Albums produced by Norman Granz
1979 live albums
Pablo Records live albums